73rd ACE Eddie Awards
March 5, 2023

Feature Film (Drama):
Top Gun: Maverick

Feature Film (Comedy):
Everything Everywhere All at Once

The 73rd American Cinema Editors Eddie Awards were presented on March 5, 2023, at the Royce Hall in Los Angeles, honoring the best editors in films and television of 2022. The nominees were announced on February 1, 2023.

Gina Prince-Bythewood was honored with the ACE Golden Eddie Filmmaker of the Year Award, while Lynne Willingham and Don Zimmerman both received the Career Achievement Award.

Winners and nominees

Film

Television

Anne V. Coates Award
 Jazmin Jamias – American Film Institute
 Tianze Sun – American Film Institute
 Adriana Guevara – New York University

References

External links
 

2022 film awards
2022 in American cinema
73